Ian Lewtas (born 25 February 1954) is an Australian rules footballer who played for the Geelong in the Australian Football League (AFL).

References

External links
 
 

1954 births
Living people
Geelong Football Club players
Australian rules footballers from Victoria (Australia)